Kira Leonie Horn (born 12 February 1995) is a German field hockey player, who plays as a midfielder.

Career

Club hockey
In the German Bundesliga, Horn plays club hockey for Club an der Alster.

National teams

Under–21
Kira Horn represented the Germany U–21 side on numerous occasions throughout her junior career. Her most notable performance with the team was at the 2016 FIH Junior World Cup in Santiago, Chile. During the tournament Horn scored two goals, helping the German team to a fifth place finish.

Die Danas
In 2019, Horn made her debut for the German national team during the inaugural tournament of the FIH Pro League. The team eventually won a bronze medal at the Grand Final in Amsterdam, Netherlands, Horn's first in German colours. Horn represented the team again in August at the EuroHockey Nations Championship in Antwerp, Belgium. At the tournament, Germany finished in second place, winning Horn a silver medal.

In December 2019, Horn was named in the preliminary German Olympic squad to train for the 2020 Summer Olympics in Tokyo, Japan.

References

External links
 
 
 
 
 

1995 births
Living people
Female field hockey midfielders
German female field hockey players
Der Club an der Alster players
Feldhockey Bundesliga (Women's field hockey) players
Field hockey players at the 2020 Summer Olympics
Olympic field hockey players of Germany
Field hockey players from Hamburg
21st-century German women